The murder of William Plommer took place in Sheffield, England, on 27 April 1925. Plommer, a First World War veteran, was attacked in the street by a gang and died of his injuries shortly afterwards. Eleven men were placed under arrest in the aftermath of the murder, five of them eventually being convicted. Two of those convicted, the brothers Lawrence Fowler and Wilfred Fowler, were hanged at Armley Gaol, Leeds. The case was international news.

See also
Sheffield Gang Wars

References

External links
Police station on frontline in Sheffield gang wars, Sheffield Star, 19 September 2014.
Memories of murder and terror in war of the gangs, Yorkshire Post, 26 August 2011.

Murder in Yorkshire
History of Sheffield
Crime in Yorkshire
1925 in England
1925 murders in Europe
1920s in Yorkshire
1925 murders in the United Kingdom